Nikos (Níkos) is a Greek given name. It originates from Greek Nikolaos, which means "victory of the people". Although used as a proper first name, Nikos is also a popular nickname of the original Nikolaos (Greek) or Nicholas (English).

People

Nikos Alefantos, Greek football coach
Nikos Aliagas, Greek TV host
Nikos Anastopoulos, Greek footballer
Nikos Arabatzis, Greek footballer
Nikos Argiropoulos, Greek basketball player
Nikos Babaniotis, Greek footballer
Nikos Barboudis, Greek footballer
Nikos Barlos, Greek basketball player
Nikos Beloyannis, Greek communist and resistance leader
Nikos Boudouris, Greek basketball player
Nikos Boutzikos, Greek footballer
Nikos Christodoulou, Greek conductor and composer
Nikos Christodoulides, Greek Cypriot politician
Nikos Dabizas, Greek footballer
Nikos Dimitrakos, American ice-hockey player
Nikos Dimou, Greek writer
Nikos Ekonomou, Greek basketball player
Nikos Engonopoulos, Greek painter and poet
Nikos Filippou, Greek basketball player
Nick Galis, Greek basketball player
Nikos Gatsos, Greek poet
Nikos Ghalas, Greek footballer
Nikos Gkonis, Greek upcoming doctor
Nikos Gounaris, Greek singer and songwriter
Nikos Hadjikyriakos-Ghikas, Greek artist, writer and academic
Nikos Hadjinikolaou, Greek journalist
Nikos Hatzis, Greek basketball player
Nikos Hatzivrettas, Greek basketball player
Nikos Kaklamanakis, Greek windsurfer and sailor
Nikos Kaklamanos, Greek basketball player
Nikos Kalafatis, Greek footballer
Nikos Kalokairis, Greek footballer
Nikos Karageorgiou, Greek footballer
Nikos Karouzos, Greek poet
Nikos Karvelas, Greek songwriter and singer
Nikos Katsavakis, Greek footballer
Nikos Kazantzakis, Greek writer and philosopher
Nikos Kavvadias, Greek poet and writer
Nikos Konstantopoulos, Greek politician
Nikos Kostakis, Greek footballer
Nikos Kostenoglou, Greek footballer
Nikos Koundouros, Greek film director
Nikos Kourkoulos, Greek actor
Nikos Krotsidhas, Greek footballer

Nikos Liberopoulos, Greek footballer
Nikos Lorentzos, Greek informatics professor
Nikos Machlas, Greek footballer
Nikos Mastorakis, Greek filmmaker and radio producer
Nikos Mihas, Greek singer and songwriter
Nikos Nicolaides, Greek painter and writer
 Nikos Nicolaou (footballer born 1973), Cypriot midfielder
 Nikos Nicolaou (footballer born 1978), Cypriot defender
Nikos Nikolaidis, Greek director and a writer
Nikos Nikolaou, Greek artist
Nikos Nioplias, Greek footballer
Nikos Nisiotis, Greek basketball coach
Nikos Pantidos, Greek footballer
Nikos Papadopoulos, several people of that name
Nikos Papanikolaou, Greek basketball player
Nikos Papatakis, Greek film director
Nikos Pateras, Greek ship magnate 
Nikos Perakis, Greek writer and film director
Nikos Ploumpidis, Greek communist and resistance fighter
Nikos Poulantzas, Greco-French political sociologist
Nikos Rizos, Greek actor
Nikos Sampson, Cypriot coup d'état president
Nikos Sarganis, Greek footballer
Nikos Sergianopoulos, Greek actor
Nikos Skalkottas, Greek composer
Nikos Skarmoutsos, Greek footballer
Nikos Spiropoulos, Greek footballer
Nikos Stavropoulos, Greek basketball player
Nikos Tselios, Irish-American ice hockey player
Nikos Tsiantakis, Greek footballer
Nikos Tsiforos, Greek writer and film director
Nikos Tzogias, Greek actor
Nikos Vakalis, Greek politician
Nikos Vertis, Greek singer
Nikos Voutsis, Greek politician
Nikos Xanthopoulos, Greek actor
Nikos Xanthoulis, Greek musician and composer
Nikos Xilouris, Greek singer and songwriter
Nikos Xydakis (journalist), Greek journalist and politician
Nikos Xydakis (musician), Greek songwriter, pianist and singer
Nikos Zachariadis, Greek politician
Nikolaos Zisis, Greek basketball player

Fictional characters
Nikos, a fictional character on EastEnders
Pyrrha Nikos, a fictional character from the American web series RWBY

Other
Nikos, international underwear and accessories company.
 Nikos the Impaler, a b-grade splatter film (2003)
, a Panamanian cargo ship in service under this name in 1970

See also
Nico
Nico (given name)
Nicos

References

Greek masculine given names